Heycock is a surname. Notable people with the surname include:

Caroline Heycock, Scottish syntactician and professor
Charles Heycock FRS (1858–1931), English chemist and soldier
Llewellyn Heycock, Baron Heycock CBE (1905–1990), Welsh politician

See also
Haycock (surname)
Heyco